Rahmad Darmawan (born 28 November 1966), is an Indonesian former football player who currently works as a football coach for Liga 1 club Barito Putera. He previously played for ATM FA and Persikota Tangerang in Indonesia.

Rahmad started his coaching career with Persikota Tangerang before moving to Persipura Jayapura and later Sriwijaya. In his last season with Sriwijaya, Rahmad led the team to the Piala Indonesia title. Later he coached Persija Jakarta, Pelita Jaya and Arema Indonesia. In total he has won four championships with two clubs in the Indonesian League.

Rahmad was the coach of Indonesia U-23, and was also the assistant head coach of the Indonesia senior team, as well as caretaker head coach of the senior team in 2013.

He was a former Major in the Indonesian Navy.

Honours

Player
Persikota Tangerang
 Liga Indonesia Second Division: 1996
 Liga Indonesia First Division: 1997

Manager
Persipura Jayapura
 Liga Indonesia Premier Division: 2005

Sriwijaya F.C.
 Liga Indonesia Premier Division: 2007–08
 Piala Indonesia (3): 2007-08, 2008–09, 2010
 Indonesia President's Cup 3rd place: 2018
 East Kalimantan Governor Cup: 2018

Indonesia U-23
 Southeast Asian Games Silver Medal: 2011, 2013

Individual
 Copa Indonesia Best Coach: 2009
 Liga 1 Coach of the Month: February 2022

References

External links
The Jakarta Post – Rahmad Darmawan: The coach behind victorious Sriwijaya FC
http://bola.kompas.com/read/2013/12/15/1546387/RD.Wikipedia.Salah.Tulis.Tanggal.Lahir.Saya

1966 births
Living people
People from Metro (city)
Sportspeople from Lampung
Indonesian footballers
Indonesia international footballers
Indonesian expatriate footballers
Expatriate footballers in Malaysia
Indonesian football managers
Indonesia Super League managers
Persija Jakarta managers
Persipura Jayapura managers
Pelita Jaya FC managers
Sriwijaya F.C. managers
Arema FC managers
Indonesian military personnel
Southeast Asian Games bronze medalists for Indonesia
Southeast Asian Games medalists in football
Association football midfielders
Competitors at the 2011 Southeast Asian Games
Competitors at the 2013 Southeast Asian Games